is a Japanese actor. He is best known for his roles as Kousuke Kitamura (Ivory) in TV Tokyo's drama Happy Boys and Keisuke Nago/Kamen Rider Ixa in TV Asahi's tokusatsu series Kamen Rider Kiva. Also, he is one of PureBoys, though on March 21, 2008 he announced his graduation from the group alongside colleagues Yukihiro Takiguchi and Masei Nakayama. This graduation was made official on March 31, 2008; the "graduation ceremony" was on March 28, 2008 during the PureBoys' weekly school-themed internet broadcast show. He graduated from Nihon University. In 2016, he launched his apparel brand "StarLean". On March 31, 2017, he left the talent agency Box Corporation to retire from the entertainment business, but from 2018, he is affiliated with the talent agency G-Star.Pro.

Filmography

TV 
Happy! 2 (TBS, 2006) 
Happy Boys (TV Tokyo, 2007) as Kousuke Kitamura (Ivory) 
Hanazakari no Kimitachi e / Ikemen Paradise (Fuji TV, 2007) as Hikaru Yao
Hontou ni Atta Kowai Hanashi Summer Special 2007 (FujiTV, 2007) 
Tadashii Ouji no Tsukurikata (TV Tokyo, 2008) as Tamon Sakura [ep. 12]
Kamen Rider Kiva  (TV Asahi, 2008) as Keisuke Nago/Kamen Rider Ixa
Mei-chan no Shitsuji (Fuji TV, 2009) as Roppongi
Buzzer Beat! (Fuji TV, 2009) as Yoichi Oze

Movie 
The Death Game Park(2010)
Madafakutori (lead role) as Akira
Ongakubito (2010)
Takumi-kun Series: Soshite Harukaze ni Sasayaite (2007) as Giichi Saki (Gii)
Kamen Rider Kiva: The King of Hell Castle (2008) as Keisuke Nago/Kamen Rider Ixa
Kamen Rider × Kamen Rider Gaim & Wizard: The Fateful Sengoku Movie Battle (2013) as Kiva Army Warlord

Stage 
7Cheers!~Tobe! Jibun To Iu Daichi Kara~ [with PureBOYS] (October 3–8, 2007)
Masked Rider Kiva Live&Show @Zepp Tokyo [with Kiva cast] (August 7, 2008)
Masked Rider Kiva Christmas Live&Show: Holy Fang Party [with Kiva cast] (December 25, 2008)

CD 
"Happy Boys Image Collection 3 ~In the Future~" as Ivory (Kousuke Kitamura), 2007
"Kampai Je T'aime" [with PureBOYS], 2007
"Fight for Justice ~Individual-System NAGO ver.~" as Keisuke Nago, 2008
"Inherited-System Masked Rider IXA Tribute Album" as Keisuke Nago, 2008
"Don't lose yourself" as Keisuke Nago, 2008
"IXA-cise" as Keisuke Nago, 2008
"IXA-cise2 (Body rhythm Edit.)" as Keisuke Nago, 2009
"Kato Keisuke Pieces of Dream"

Photobooks 
 Aqua (Fuso Publishing Inc., released July 18, 2007)
 PureBOYS 1st photo collection (Goma Books, released November 16, 2007) 
 Kamen Rider Kiva Character Visual Guide "Prelude", 2008
 Gekijouban Kamen Rider Kiva Official Photobook, July 2008
 Kamen Rider Kiva Character Visual Guide "Concerto", August 2008

CM 
 Intelligence, "an" and "in love byte" Version (2007) 
 Kao (Face) "Men's Biore" (2008)
 DataCardDass Kamen Rider Battle Ganbaride (2009)

External links 
 Official agency profile 

1988 births
Living people
Japanese male television actors